O Tempo is a Brazilian newspaper based in Contagem, in the Greater Belo Horizonte, state of Minas Gerais. The newspaper was created in 1996 by the Italian businessman and politician who became a naturalized Brazilian Vittorio Medioli and is owned by Grupo SADA, through its publisher, Sempre Editora, which also controls the tabloid Super Notícia and a radio station, Rádio Super. O Tempo is the largest newspaper in Minas Gerais and one of the largest in Brazil.

References

External links
Official website

1996 establishments in Brazil
Newspapers established in 1996
Mass media in Belo Horizonte
Portuguese-language newspapers